Jennifer Aniston is an American actress, producer, and businesswoman who made her film debut in the 1988 comic science fiction film Mac and Me in an uncredited role of a dancer in McDonald's. Two years later, she made her television debut in the short-lived television series Molloy (1990) followed that year by a starring role in Ferris Bueller, a television adaptation of the 1986 film Ferris Bueller's Day Off; both series were cancelled in their first seasons. In 1993, she starred as the young heroine in the horror comedy Leprechaun, her first major role in a feature film. She was offered a spot as a featured player on Saturday Night Live but turned this down to accept a starring role on the NBC television sitcom Friends (1994–2004).

Aniston gained worldwide recognition for portraying Rachel Green on Friends, a role which earned her five Primetime Emmy Award nominations (two for Supporting Actress, three for Lead Actress), winning one for Lead Actress and also a Golden Globe Award. During its ninth and tenth seasons, Aniston became one of the highest-paid television actors of all time, earning $1 million for each episode. In 2003, Aniston appeared in the fantasy comedy Bruce Almighty, starring opposite Jim Carrey, Morgan Freeman, and Steve Carell. In the film she portrayed Grace Connelly whose boyfriend (Carey) is offered the chance to be God for one week. The film grossed $484 million worldwide, making it Aniston's biggest commercial success in film. In 2004, she starred in the romantic comedy Along Came Polly alongside Ben Stiller, for which she received a nomination for Best Dance Sequence at the MTV Movie & TV Awards. In 2006, she appeared in Peyton Reed's romantic comedy-drama The Break-Up. In the film, she plays Brooke who breaks up with her boyfriend (Vince Vaughn) but does not want to move out of his luxurious condo. For The Break-Up, she was nominated for two People's Choice Awards and two Teen Choice Awards, winning the former for Favorite Female Movie Star and the latter for Movies – Choice Chemistry (shared with Vaughn).

Following The Break-Up, Aniston starred in commercially successful films including Marley & Me (2008), He's Just Not That Into You (2009), The Bounty Hunter (2010), and Wanderlust (2012). In Marley & Me (2008), she starred as newlywed Jenny Grogan opposite Owen Wilson, based on the memoir of the same name by John Grogan. The film grossed $247.8 million at the box office, and she received two national nominations including the Kids' Choice Awards for Favorite Movie Actress. In 2010, she appeared as a guest star on the sitcom Cougar Town alongside former Friends co-star Courteney Cox. In 2014, Aniston starred in Daniel Barnz's drama Cake, with her role highly praised by some critics. She received numerous awards and nominations for her dramatic performance, including nominations for a Golden Globe and a Screen Actors Guild Award, and she won the Montecito Award at the Santa Barbara International Film Festival. In 2019, she starred in the web television drama series The Morning Show, for which she is also the executive producer. For her performance in The Morning Show, she was nominated for a Golden Globe.

Aside from acting, Aniston has directed three films including Room 10, Burma: It Can't Wait, and Five. She has also appeared in several music videos, video games, and theatrical plays.  Along with Brad Pitt and Brad Grey, former CEO of Paramount Pictures, Aniston founded the film production company Plan B Entertainment in 2002; she and Grey withdrew in 2005. In 2008, Aniston and Kristin Hahn co-founded the production company Echo Films.

Film

Television

Video games

Music videos

Theater

See also
 List of awards and nominations received by Jennifer Aniston

References

External links
 

Performances
Actress filmographies
American filmographies